Alex Sutton (born 23 September 2002) is an English professional rugby league footballer who plays as a  for the Wigan Warriors in the Betfred Super League.

He has spent time on loan from Wigan at the Newcastle Thunder in the Betfred Championship, and the Swinton Lions and Oldham in Betfred League 1.

In 2022 Sutton made his Super League début for the Warriors against Hull Kingston Rovers.

References

External links
Wigan Warriors profile

2002 births
Living people
English rugby league players
Newcastle Thunder players
Oldham R.L.F.C. players
Rugby league centres
Rugby league players from Warrington
Swinton Lions players
Wigan Warriors players